Miltenyi Biotec is a global biotechnology company headquartered near Cologne in Bergisch Gladbach, Germany. The company is a provider of products and services that support scientists, clinical researchers, and physicians across basic research, translational research, and clinical applications. The company comes up with solutions covering techniques of sample preparation, cell separation, cell sorting, flow cytometry, cell culture, molecular analysis, clinical applications and small animal imaging. Miltenyi Biotec has more than 3,000 employees in 28 countries and more than 17,000 products.

Products
Miltenyi Biotec products have been cited in more than 20,000 publications and used in more than 35,000 clinical treatments to date. Many of the publications that have cited Miltenyi Biotec products can be accessed through CiteAb, an antibody search engine which lists 4591 Miltenyi Biotec products. Miltenyi Biotec instruments, reagents and services support basic research, clinical research, and the translation of basic research findings into clinical applications that enhance human health and treat severe disease. Its product portfolio addresses a complete range of techniques from bench to bedside. Services offered by Miltenyi Biotec include gene expression analysis  and contract production of biologicals according to GMP guidelines.

Miltenyi Biotec technologies are used in applications concerned with accessing, analyzing, and utilizing primary and primary-derived cells – across basic research, translational research, and clinical applications. Examples of these applications include sample preparation, cell separation, cell sorting, flow cytometry, molecular applications, cell culture up to GMP grade, preclinical imaging, clinical-grade cell preservation, and clinical-scale cell processing. The company’s reagents and devices are used primarily in the research areas of immunology, stem cell biology, neuroscience and cancer.

Sample Preparation 
Miltenyi Biotec offers instruments, tools and reagents to facilitate sample preparation.

Application areas
Miltenyi Biotec products are used commonly in the application areas of immunology, stem cell biology, neuroscience and cancer. Their products are used from basic research to clinical applications and are designed to support the successful translation of findings into practical applications that enhance human health and well being. Enabling translational research is a major mission of the company, as is advancing cellular therapy. The company’s products aim to support the development of cellular therapies and make cellular therapy a more viable reality for more patients.

History
 1989 – Stefan Miltenyi invents magnetic-activated cell separation
 1990 – Miltenyi Biotec patents MACS Technology
 1992 – Miltenyi Biotec opens its U.S. subsidiary
 1995 – Miltenyi Biotec opens its UK subsidiary
 1998 – Miltenyi Biotec opens its France, Italy and Spain subsidiaries
 2001 – Miltenyi Biotec opens its China location
 2002 – Miltenyi Biotec acquires the plasma absorber technology developed by PlasmaSelect AG and markets the products under the trademark TheraSorb
 2002 – Miltenyi Biotec opens its Australia subsidiary
 2003 – Miltenyi Biotec opens its GMP facility in Teterow, Germany
 2003 – Miltenyi Biotec opens its Japan and Singapore subsidiaries
 2003 – Miltenyi Biotec acquires Memorec Biotec GmbH
 2004 – Miltenyi Biotec opens its Benelux subsidiary in the Netherlands
 2008 – Miltenyi Biotec acquires Medic Tools AG 
 2008 – Miltenyi Biotec launches its autoMACS Pro Separator cell separation instrument
 2008 – Miltenyi Biotec launches its MACSQuant Analyzer flow cytometry instrument
 2011 – Miltenyi Biotec acquires Coley Pharmaceutical Group
 2011 – Miltenyi Biotec partners with TeutoCell to develop novel cell culture techniques 
 2012 – Miltenyi Biotec opens its Nordic subsidiary in Sweden
 2012 – Miltenyi Biotec opens its Korea subsidiary in Seoul, South Korea
 2013 – Miltenyi Biotec acquires Owl biomedical, adding to their portfolio new microchip-based cell sorting technology
 2014 – Miltenyi Biotec receives FDA approval for CliniMACS® CD34 Reagent System for prevention of graft-versus-host disease in the treatment of acute myeloid leukemia
 2014 – Miltenyi Biotec acquires gene therapy assets from Lentigen Corporation
 2017 – Acquisition of imaging specialist Sensovation AG
 2018 – Acquisition of microscopy specialist LaVision BioTec

Structure
Miltenyi Biotec is a limited liability company (referred to as GmbH in Germany). The officers of the company are Stefan Miltenyi (Founder and President), Dr. Boris Stoffel, Norbert Hentschel, Dr. Juergen Schmitz, Dr. Anoon Overstijns. Headquartered in Bergisch Gladbach with a GMP facility in Teterow, Germany, Miltenyi Biotec also has locations in the United States (two GMP facilities), Great Britain, France, Belgium, Italy, Spain, China, Australia, Japan, The Netherlands, Singapore and Sweden. 

The company has more than 3,500 employees worldwide (approx. 800 in the United States). 

The North American Divisions are supported by Miltenyi Biotec North America, which provides all central services to the North American Divisions.

Controversies
In March 2022, citing Russian Invasion of Ukraine as the reason, Miltenyi Biotec suspended supplies of CAR-T therapy equipment to Russian Rogachev children's hospital, leaving patients with incurable tumors for which all other possibilities have been exhausted with no treatment options. While the treatment was available, 90% of child patients were achieving remission, with at least 54 lives saved since 2018.

References

Biotechnology companies established in 1989
Biotechnology companies of Germany
Companies based in North Rhine-Westphalia
1989 establishments in West Germany
German companies established in 1989